It's Always You is a song recorded and composed by Chinese singer-songwriter Xu Weizhou. It is the third single released from Xu's album "The Time". It is included in the second quarter of the album.

Background and release
It's Always You is composed and produced by Lee McCutcheon with the assistance of Jeremy Thurber in lyrical writing. It has a length of three minutes and eighteen seconds. It is the third single released from Xu's album "The Time" and is included in its 2nd quarter. It is Xu's first attempt at singing EDM and his second pure English song next to "I Remember Your Eyes". The whole quarter was officially released on 20 October 2017; same day of his 23rd birthday for free online. The official music video was directed by Chen Man and was released on 31 October at several Chinese streaming sites.

Upon its release, netizens praised the improvement of Xu's English pronunciation. The music video has topped the Billboard China V Chart consecutively for 2 weeks.

Xu performed the song live for the first time during his "Light 2017" concert on 9 December.

Credits and personnel
Credits were adapted from the official music video. 
Star Power (Beijing) Culture Media Co., Ltd and Timmy Xu Studio – presentation, production
Lee McCutcheon – producer, composer, lyricist, music arrangement, backing vocals, backing vocals arrangement
Jeremy Thurber – lyricist, backing vocals, backing vocals arrangement
Xu Weizhou – lead vocals
Chen Man – director, music video producer
Gabrielle – executive director / D.O.P.
Li Hao – executive producer
Mia Shen, Haruki Gao, Kary Tsui – video production crews
Paul Gatehouse – mixing engineer
Wildtone London – mixing studio

Chart performance

Weekly

References

2017 songs
2017 singles